Alvah Robert "Al" Holbert (November 11, 1946 – September 30, 1988) was an American automobile racing driver who was a five-time champion of the IMSA Camel GT series. And was the fifth driver to complete the informal triple Crown of endurance racing. He once held the record with the most IMSA race wins at 49.

Life and career 

Holbert was born in Abington, Pennsylvania. He was the son of racecar driver Bob Holbert, who also ran a Volkswagen-Porsche dealership in Warrington, PA, near Philadelphia (one of the first Porsche dealerships in the USA).  Holbert worked for Roger Penske while studying at Lehigh University, where he graduated with a B.S. in Mechanical Engineering in 1968.  Holbert began racing Porsches in the northeast division of the SCCA, racing a C-production Porsche 914/6 against, among others, Bob Tullius (Triumph TR6) and Bob Sharp (Datsun 240Z).  In 1971, Holbert scored his first race win in a Porsche and would turn professional in 1974.  He would score his first of his two IMSA titles in 1976 and 1977 in a Dekon Monza.  Being a Porsche supporter, Holbert allowed Porsche technicians to inspect his Monza, which would eventually lead to Porsche entering the series with turbocharged cars such as the 934 that led to a Porsche dominance for the following years.  During that time Holbert jumped ship to the Stuttgart marque.

From 1976 to 1979 Holbert raced 19 career races in NASCAR.  In those 19 races, in which he drove primarily for James Hylton, Holbert scored 4 top ten finishes.

He also added an IMSA GTP title during 1983 in a Chevrolet and Porsche powered March 83G when Porsche were unable to make their 956 eligible for competition that year. February 27, 1983, he won the Grand Prix of Miami. Holbert finished fourth in the 1984 Indianapolis 500, and led the Porsche IndyCar effort in 1987–1988. He won the 24 Hours of Le Mans in 1983, 1986, and 1987, the 24 Hours of Daytona in 1986 and 1987 and the 12 Hours of Sebring in 1976 and 1981. Holbert was the head of the Porsche North America's Motorsports Division and ran his own racing team, Holbert Racing. He clinched two more IMSA GTP championships back to back in both 1985 and 1986 driving a Lowenbrau sponsored Porsche 962. In 1988, Holbert realised that the Porsche 962 that had brought him success in his earlier years was becoming outmoded by the newer generation of racers from the likes of the Jaguar XJR-9 and the Electramotive's Nissan GTP ZX-Turbo.  His plan was to build an open top Porsche-engined racer for customer teams.  Porsche eventually built such a car nearly a decade later, although the WSC-95 would never be built for customer teams as Holbert and Porsche intended.

Death and afterwards 
On September 30, 1988, Holbert was at the IMSA Columbus Ford Dealers 500. That evening, Holbert was fatally injured when his privately owned propeller driven Piper PA-60 aircraft crashed shortly after takeoff near Columbus, Ohio, when a clamshell door was not closed. At the end of the season, the team was disbanded and IMSA would retire his race number 14.

Former Holbert Racing chief mechanic Kevin Doran later became a noted team owner. Son, Todd Holbert was also a mechanic, and is currently with Toyota developing their NASCAR Tundra and Camry vehicles.

Awards
Holbert was inducted into the International Motorsports Hall of Fame in 1993.
He was inducted into the Motorsports Hall of Fame of America in 1993.

Gallery

Racing record

SCCA National Championship Runoffs

Complete 24 Hours of Le Mans results

American open–wheel racing results
(key)

CART

References

External links

NTSB accident report

NASCAR drivers
1946 births
1988 deaths
Champ Car drivers
Indianapolis 500 drivers
International Motorsports Hall of Fame inductees
International Race of Champions drivers
Trans-Am Series drivers
People from Abington Township, Montgomery County, Pennsylvania
Victims of aviation accidents or incidents in 1988
Victims of aviation accidents or incidents in the United States
Lehigh University alumni
Accidental deaths in Ohio
24 Hours of Le Mans drivers
24 Hours of Le Mans winning drivers
24 Hours of Daytona drivers
IMSA GT Championship drivers
Racing drivers from Pennsylvania
Racing drivers from Philadelphia
World Sportscar Championship drivers
SCCA Formula Super Vee drivers
SCCA National Championship Runoffs participants
12 Hours of Sebring drivers
Porsche Motorsports drivers